Seven Chances is a 1916 play written by Roi Cooper Megrue and produced by David Belasco. It opened 8 August 1916 at the George M. Cohan's Theatre and closed in December 1916 after 151 performances.

Adaptations 
The play was adapted in 1925 as Seven Chances and in 1999 as The Bachelor.

External links 

1916 plays
American plays adapted into films